Dunany may refer to:

 Dunany, Quebec
 Dunany Point, Co. Louth, Ireland